Richard Marc Edward Evonitz (July 29, 1963 – June 27, 2002) was an American serial killer, kidnapper, and rapist responsible for the deaths of three teenaged girls in Spotsylvania County, Virginia, and the abduction and rape of a 15-year-old girl in Richland County, South Carolina. Evonitz has been suspected of other murders, and confessed a number of crimes to his sister shortly before committing suicide.

Early life
Richard Marc Edward Evonitz was born at Providence Hospital in Columbia, South Carolina, to Joseph and Tess Ragin Evonitz. He was the first of three children; two sisters, Kristen and Jennifer, followed him in 1968 and 1971. Known as Marc to avoid confusion with a paternal uncle also named Richard, he graduated from Irmo High School in 1980 at age 16.

Career
After high school, Evonitz worked briefly as the manager of a Jiffy Lube, before joining the United States Navy. He served as a sonar technician and received a Good Conduct Medal before being honorably discharged after eight years of service.

Following his stint in the Navy, Evonitz worked steadily at businesses that sold compressors and grinding equipment. He filed for bankruptcy in 1997, unable to keep up with bills following a divorce, and had a house foreclosed in 1999 following a failed business venture, but at the time of his death, Evonitz had been working at an air-compressor company since moving to South Carolina a few years earlier.

Personal life
Evonitz was married twice, first to Bonnie Lou Gower from 1988 to 1996, then to Hope Marie Crowley from 1999 until his death.

Criminal career
In January 1987, Evonitz exposed himself and masturbated in front of a 15-year-old girl in Orange Park, Florida. He was arrested a month later when his ship returned to port. He entered a plea of no contest and was sentenced to three years' probation.

Evonitz is suspected of a 1994 abduction and rape and a 1995 rape in Spotsylvania, Virginia.

On September 9, 1996, Evonitz abducted 16-year-old Sofia Silva from her front yard near Loriella Park in Spotsylvania County. Her decomposed body was found a month later in a creek off State Route 3 in King George County.

On May 1, 1997, Evonitz abducted sisters Kristin, 15, and Kati Lisk, 12, from their front lawn after school. After sexually assaulting them, he strangled the sisters and dumped their bodies in the South Anna River. Their bodies were found five days later.

On June 24, 2002, Evonitz abducted 15-year-old Kara Robinson Chamberlain from a friend's yard in Columbia, South Carolina, after holding a gun to her head and then forcing her into a plastic bin. He took her to his apartment, raped her, forced her to smoke marijuana, and tied her to his bed. Robinson was able to free herself while Evonitz was sound asleep, escape, and identify her abductor to the police using information she was able to find on Evonitz's fridge. Evonitz fled after finding her gone and was tracked by the police to Sarasota, Florida. As they surrounded him, he killed himself with his gun.

Adaptation
On February 11, 2023, Lifetime released a television film called The Girl Who Escaped: The Kara Robinson Story. The film starred Katie Douglas as Kara Robinson, Cara Buono as Debra Robinson, and Kristian Bruun as Richard Evonitz. Elizabeth Smart serves as an executive producer.

See also
 List of serial killers in the United States

References

Further reading
 Into the Water, Diane Fanning (St. Martin's, 2004)

1963 births
1987 crimes in the United States
1996 murders in the United States
2002 suicides
20th-century American criminals
21st-century American criminals
American murderers of children
American rapists
American serial killers
Criminals from South Carolina
Male serial killers
People from Columbia, South Carolina
Suicides by firearm in Florida
United States Navy sailors